Star Trek: Picard is an American web television series featuring the character Jean-Luc Picard, created for CBS All Access by Akiva Goldsman, Michael Chabon, Kirsten Beyer, and Alex Kurtzman. It is the eighth series in the Star Trek franchise, and was launched in 2020 as part of Kurtzman's expansion of the franchise. Picard begins 20 years after Star Trek: Nemesis (2002) and sees a retired Picard deeply affected by the death of Data in that film as well as the destruction of the planet Romulus in the film Star Trek (2009).

Patrick Stewart executive produces the series and stars as Picard, reprising his role from the series Star Trek: The Next Generation as well as other Star Trek media. Alison Pill, Isa Briones, Evan Evagora, Michelle Hurd, Santiago Cabrera, and Harry Treadaway also star. Characters seen previously in Star Trek also appear, including Brent Spiner as Data, Jonathan Del Arco as Hugh, and Jeri Ryan as Seven of Nine. In September 2021, Annie Wersching announced that she would be joining the series as the Borg Queen.

In April 2022, it was confirmed that all the last main cast members of Star Trek: The Next Generation would be joining the cast of Star Trek: Picard. To join Patrick Stewart is Gates McFadden, Michael Dorn, Brent Spiner, LeVar Burton, Marina Sirtis and Jonathan Frakes. Jeri Ryan and Michelle Hurd have confirmed they will also return for Season 3. As of 7th May 2022, Alison Pill, Isa Briones, Santiago Cabrera and Evan Evagora have confirmed they will not be a part of season 3. 

The following list includes Star Trek: Picards main cast, as well as all guest stars deemed to have had recurring roles throughout the series, and a supplementary list of other noteworthy guests.

Overview
  = Main cast (Credited main cast member) 
  = Recurring cast (3+ appearances in a season)
  = Guest cast (1-2 appearances per season)

Main characters

Jean-Luc Picard

Jean-Luc Picard (portrayed by Patrick Stewart) is a retired Starfleet admiral and former captain of its flagship vessel USS Enterprise. Stewart was reprising his role from Star Trek: The Next Generation and subsequent television series and movies by August 4, 2018. In the series, Picard has been retired from Starfleet for 14 years, living in his chateau in France, until he meets Dahj and goes on his personal mission to find and to protect her sister. He has a brain condition that is terminal. At the end of the first season, he dies from his brain anomaly, but his consciousness is transferred into a new synthetic "golem" body that Soong had prepared.

Agnes Jurati
Agnes Jurati (portrayed by Alison Pill) is a doctor working for the Daystrom Institute's Division of Advanced Synthetic Research in Okinawa who was recruited by Dr. Bruce Maddox. She hopes to interact with an actual synth. After being subject to a Vulcan mind meld by Commodore Oh where she sees the atrocities from the Admonition, she is ordered to join Picard's  crew to kill the synth as well as Maddox, who was also her lover. She also ingests a tracker that allows Oh and Narek to track the La Sirena.

Soji Asha  
Dahj and Soji Asha (portrayed by Isa Briones) are the twin android daughters of the late Lieutenant Commander Data. In the opening episode, Dahj asks Picard to help her find out why she is being attacked—and why she is able to defend herself so well. She is destroyed before his eyes. Meanwhile, Soji has been working on a Borg cube known as the "Artifact", now in the hands of Romulans, where she helps to reclaim victims of the Borg. Briones also portrays Sutra, an android on her home planet Coppelion, created by Bruce Maddox and Altan Inigo Soong. Sutra's twin, Jana, was killed prior to the series' events when she and another synth named Flower were the envoys to make first contact with USS Ibn Majid.

Narek
Narek (portrayed by Harry Treadaway) is a Romulan at the Artifact Borg cube, spying on Soji Asha for the Zhat Vash. At the beginning of the series, he befriends and becomes Soji's lover as part of his cover. In the episode "The Impossible Box", he guides Soji through a Zhal Makh meditation exercise so that she reveals the whereabouts of her home world, and then betrays her. He then pursues Rios's ship, eventually following it to Soji's home world Coppelius. Although he is captured, he is freed by Sutra and returns to the Artifact. He works a deal with Rios to try to infiltrate the synth base and disable their newly built beacon. Picard showrunner Michael Chabon said there was originally a scene where Narek was taken into custody by the Federation but it was dropped during the editing of the episode finale.

Raffi Musiker
Rafaella "Raffi" Musiker (portrayed by Michelle Hurd) is a former Starfleet intelligence officer struggling with substance abuse who served as Picard's first officer during the Romulan evacuation.  When she joins Picard's crew, she handles communications and is able to get clearances so Picard and friends can land on the planet. At Freecloud, she meets her son, who is married with an expectant child, but he rejects her attempt at reconciliation.  She begins a relationship with Seven at the end of season 1 and rejoins Starfleet before season 2.

Chris Rios
Cristóbal "Chris" Rios (portrayed by Santiago Cabrera) is a former Starfleet officer, now owner and pilot of La Sirena. He is also a skilled thief. Picard has hired his services on Raffi's recommendation. Cabrera also plays Rios's ship's 5 holograms, each with their own area of expertise in servicing the ship and its crew.  He was former Stafleet but leaves because of what happened on the USS Ibn Majid he returns to Starfleet before season 2

Elnor
Elnor (portrayed by Evan Evagora) is a Romulan refugee, who was relocated from Picard's efforts 14 years prior. He is an expert in hand-to-hand combat and is fiercely loyal to Picard. He has been raised never to lie. In the first season, he pledges to support Picard, and then briefly supports Hugh when Picard and Soji escape from the Artifact.  He joins Starfleet Academy and is a cadet in season 2.

Star Trek franchise characters 
The actors from the Star Trek franchise who have made appearances in the series. Some of the major ones are billed as special guest stars.
 Data (portrayed by Brent Spiner) is a sentient android who served under Picard as Second Officer and Chief Operations Officer aboard the Enterprise, until he sacrificed himself to save Picard in Star Trek: Nemesis. Picard sees Data in his dreams in "Remembrance", and in a quantum simulation in the season 1 finale episode "Et in Arcadia Ego, Part 2". 
 Hugh (portrayed by Jonathan Del Arco) is a former Borg drone who appeared in the Next Generation episodes "I, Borg" and "Descent, Part II". He has since become the Executive Director of the Borg Reclamation Project.
 Seven of Nine (portrayed by Jeri Ryan) is a former Borg drone liberated from the Collective by Captain Kathryn Janeway and the crew of the USS Voyager. Ryan was a regular on Star Trek: Voyager seasons four through seven. She is part of a group called the Fenris Rangers that helps people in need. She is upgraded to main cast in season 2 where she is in a relationship with Raffi and is Captain of La Sirena.
 William Riker (portrayed by Jonathan Frakes) is a retired Starfleet Captain of the USS Titan and formerly Picard's first officer on the Enterprise. He and Troi married at the beginning of Star Trek: Nemesis. Riker appears with Troi in "Nepenthe" and by himself in "Et in Arcadia Ego, Part 2". 
 Deanna Troi (portrayed by Marina Sirtis) is former counselor on the Enterprise, she and Riker married at the beginning of Star Trek: Nemesis. Troi appears with Riker in "Nepenthe".
Icheb (portrayed by Casey King) - Seven of Nine's surrogate son who appeared on Star Trek: Voyager and appears in "Stardust City Rag". 
 Altan Inigo Soong (portrayed by Brent Spiner), is a scientist and the biological son of Noonien Soong, a research partner of Bruce Maddox, who resides on Coppelius as a surrogate father to the synthetics living there.
 Q (portrayed by John de Lancie), a member of the Q Continuum who appeared in season 2.
 The Borg Queen (portrayed by Annie Wersching) is the de facto leader of the Borg Collective who first appeared in Star Trek: First Contact, and was a recurring antagonist in the later seasons of Star Trek: Voyager. She will have a major role in season 2.
 Wesley Crusher (portrayed by Wil Wheaton) is a Traveler and a former member of the Enterprise-D crew. He makes a cameo appearance in the season 2 finale Farewell, offering Kore Soong the chance to join the Travelers.

Recurring characters 
Series original characters introduced in season 1

 Laris (portrayed by Orla Brady) is a Romulan and a former member of the Tal Shiar. Laris manages Picard's vineyard and household in France.
 Zhaban (portrayed by Jamie McShane), a Romulan and former member of the Tal Shiar. He acts as Picard's butler at his estate in France.
 Soji's mother (portrayed by Sumalee Montano), a woman who appears on the video calls, claiming to be Soji and Dahj's mother.
 Narissa (portrayed by Peyton List), Narek's sister, a Romulan spy and member of the Zhat Vash. She is posing as Lieutenant Rizzo, a human operative of Starfleet Security on the Borg Cube.
 Commodore Oh (portrayed by Tamlyn Tomita), a Vulcan Starfleet officer and head of Starfleet Security, but secretly a half-Romulan operative of the Zhat Vash and Rizzo's contact in the Federation.
 Ramdha (portrayed by Rebecca Wisocky), a Romulan that was previously assimilated by the Borg. She is placed in the mental ward of the Artifact Borg cube. She realizes Soji is one of the twin sisters as predicted by her cards, and calls her the Destroyer. In "Broken Pieces", it is revealed that she was a member of the Zhat Vash sisterhood with Oh and Narissa. She had gone mad from seeing the Admonition. She was the guardian of Narek and Narissa, the latter of whom refers to her as her aunt.

Notes

References

 
Picard
Picard